Sabse Bada Sukh is a 1972 Bollywood drama film directed by Hrishikesh Mukherjee.

Plot
Village born Lalloo re-locates to Bombay, and returns a wealthy man. He goes to meet his friend, Shankar alias Bhompu, and together they meet and share tales, mostly about women, sex, and playboy magazines' pictures. A Bollywood movie director is shooting a film nearby, and they go and meet him and his beautiful actress, Urvashi. After meeting Urvashi, Shankar feigns a racking cough, and tells his family that he must go to Bombay, and seek medical treatment. Together he and Lalloo take the next train to Bombay to see if they can find the biggest happiness in life.

Cast
Vijay Arora as Shankar 
G. Asrani as Asrani, Movie Director 
Kumud Damle   
Utpal Dutt as Vedji 
Meeta Faiyyaz   
Rabi Ghosh as Lalloo 
Tarun Ghosh as Pandit chacha 
Sanjeev Kumar as a Narrator 
Keshto Mukherjee as Guide at railway station 
Meena Rai  
Rajnibala as Urvashi, Movie Actress 
Tun Tun

Soundtrack

External links
 

1972 films
1970s Hindi-language films
1972 drama films
Films directed by Hrishikesh Mukherjee
Films scored by Salil Chowdhury